Henry Bingham  was an Irish politician.

Bingham was educated at Trinity College, Dublin. He sat in the Irish House of Commons as a Member of Parliament (MP) in the Irish House of Commons for Mayo from 1707 to 1714; and for Castlebar from 1715 to 1743.

References

Alumni of Trinity College Dublin
Members of the Parliament of Ireland (pre-1801) for County Mayo constituencies
Irish MPs 1703–1713
Irish MPs 1713–1714
Irish MPs 1715–1727
Irish MPs 1727–1760